Briskman is a surname. Notable people with the surname include:

Juli Briskman, American politician and journalist
Shulamit "Mita" Briskman, wife of Israeli scientist Moshe Zakai 
 Robert Briskman (born 1932), an official with Sirius Satellite Radio

Jewish surnames
Surnames of Belarusian origin
Toponymic surnames
Yiddish-language surnames